Herut (lit. Freedom) is a moshav in central Israel. Located in the Sharon plain near Tel Mond, it falls under the jurisdiction of Lev HaSharon Regional Council.

History
The village was founded in 1930 by the Herut society, an organization of  immigrants who settled in Palestine during the Third and Fourth Aliyah. One of the early agricultural crops was peanuts. Landmarks buildings include a culture hall, Beit Ha'am, built in 1959. Among the founders of the moshav were the parents of Nechama Rivlin, who had immigrated from Ukraine.

Notable residents
Nechama Rivlin

References

External links

Herut website 

Moshavim
Populated places established in 1930
Populated places in Central District (Israel)
1930 establishments in Mandatory Palestine